stylized as GOBLIN SLAYER! in Latin script, is a Japanese dark fantasy light novel series written by Kumo Kagyu and illustrated by Noboru Kannatsuki. A manga adaptation by Kōsuke Kurose is serialized in the Monthly Big Gangan magazine, and a second adaptation by Masahiro Ikeno runs in the same magazine. A prequel manga by Kento Eida runs in Young Gangan. Both the novels and the manga adaptations have been licensed by North American publisher Yen Press. Three audio drama CDs have been released, bundled with the fourth, sixth, seventh, and eighth light novels. An anime television series adaptation by White Fox aired from October to December 2018. An anime film, titled Goblin Slayer: Goblin's Crown, premiered in February 2020. A second season by Liden Films is set to premiere in 2023.

Plot
In a world of fantasy, adventurers come from far and wide to join the Guild. They complete contracts to earn gold and glory. An inexperienced priestess joins her first adventuring party, but comes into danger after her first contract involving goblins goes wrong. As the rest of her party is either wiped out or taken out of commission, she is saved by a man known as Goblin Slayer, an adventurer whose only purpose is the eradication of goblins with extreme prejudice.

Characters
The characters in this story do not carry proper names but are named by their classes.

A 20-year-old silver ranked adventurer who only concerns himself with hunting , to the point where the Guild has given him a Specialist classification due to both the sheer number of goblins that he has killed as well as his work in studying their habits and biology. Uninterested in fame or glory, Goblin Slayer is only interested in goblin hunting quests and refuses others, although he occasionally accepts other quests if he is low on funds or for reasons beyond his control.
As a child he was the sole survivor of a goblin attack on his village and witnessed his older sister being gang raped and murdered by goblins while hiding under the floor boards of his house, an event that defined his deep hatred and homicidal obsession of killing all goblins. He is later rescued and taken in by Burglar who taught him the skills needed to kill goblins. Five years later, he applied for the adventurers' Guild and was taken in by the uncle of his childhood friend who left just before the attack on their village, Cow Girl. He uses his income as an adventurer to pay for his stay and helps with chores and deliveries.
Goblin Slayer uses equipment that appear to be average to below average and is often underestimated because of this. However his choice in gear is intentional as they serve a key purpose in hunting goblins. He wears a full suit of armor designed for protection and flexibility when hunting goblins in narrow caves. Unlike most adventurers, Goblin Slayer always wears a helmet he got when starting out as an adventurer to protect himself from being knocked out by rocks or blows to the head. He generally uses a short sword and buckler in battle as larger weapons are harder to use in small caves. He also takes weapons from slain goblins to use against them as his own weapons are frequently broken or dulled in blood and fat. Goblin Slayer is also known to carry magical or enchanted items, having a ring that lets him breathe under water and a gate scroll that is connected to the bottom of the ocean. His ruthless style of combat relies more on pragmatism such as setting traps, using a weapon against its user, and taking whatever advantage that may come. He even uses his own imagination to re-purpose a protection spell in order to kill all the goblins in a burning elven fortress.
His brutality and mercilessness towards all goblin-kind often shock others who witness it. He will kill any and all goblins he encounters, even children as he believes they are no better than fully grown goblins and are just as dangerous if they are left alive.

The main female protagonist. She is initially a 15-year-old porcelain ranked adventurer, the lowest rank, as she had just joined. Her personality consists of being young, kind, and generally helpful. She is capable of performing healing magic, miracle of holy light, and protective spells with a high amount of proficiency. After her first goblin hunt rapidly goes downhill, she is saved by Goblin Slayer and joins him as a new party. After initially being disgusted by both Goblin Slayer's merciless brutality towards goblins as well as him continuously drenching her in goblin blood which covers the scents of humans, elves, and women, she quickly gets used to it, even commenting on it when they initially fought alongside High Elf Archer when she started complaining about being covered in blood as well. Even after the horrifying events of her first quest, she still wishes to be an adventurer and help her party however she can. As she fights alongside Goblin Slayer, her proficiency with magic improves and she ranks up as an adventurer. Her backstory is that of an orphan raised in a temple into priesthood along with other children like her.

Goblin Slayer's childhood best friend and a farm hand on her uncle's farm. Her uncle took her in his farm as an assistant at first, but adopted her after her and the Goblin Slayer's families were massacred by Goblins. She clearly cares deeply for Goblin Slayer, though he seems oblivious to the depths of her affection.

A young woman who runs the Guild's front office as a receptionist and hands out contracts to adventurers. She shows concern for the villages pleading for help against the goblins, and is exasperated at how few experienced adventurers would take such jobs. This problem would leave inexperienced rookies to die from them, or worse. She holds great amounts of respect for Goblin Slayer, due to his willingness to take on many goblin contracts others would not touch.

A 2,000-year-old  adventurer of  class. She came with Dwarf Shaman and Lizard Priest to find Goblin Slayer and recruit his help. They face some trouble early in the story as they are unable to pronounce "Goblin Slayer" and refer to him by other names (mostly Orcbolg and Beardcutter), until they find him. They reveal their objective; due to the increase in other monsters, there are not enough people to deal with goblins and the elf army cannot mobilize for mere goblins as it would create suspicion and panic. They wish to hire Goblin Slayer to help them kill goblins. She initially looks down on Goblin Slayer, due to his unkempt and weak appearance, but later comes to respect him, when she sees him in battle. She initially comes off as naive, believing that Goblin Slayer is an affront to the idea of an adventurer because he does not actually go on what she considers to be adventures. After their encounter with Ogre she comes to realize just how strong and brave Goblin Slayer is and becomes determined to make him go on a true adventure with her and the rest of their party. She is a light-weight when it comes to drinking. She is a Silver ranked adventurer.

A 107-year-old  adventurer of  class and party member with High Elf and Lizard Priest. He is a cheerful and happy person and is almost always arguing with High Elf Archer. As a Dwarf, he is good with metal, stone, and alcohol. At first glance, he is able to tell that Goblin Slayer is experienced and strong. He sometimes proves more knowledgeable than High Elf, despite being much younger. He is Silver ranked adventurer.

A  adventurer and party member with High Elf and Dwarf Shaman. Like Priestess, he can use healing magic, but he also uses a sword to fight and can summon skeletal familiars to assist him in battle. He often acts as a mediator between Dwarf and High Elf, stopping their arguments. He is a very calm and composed person. He cares deeply about nature due to his religion. He is also extremely enamored with the taste of cheese, which he finds exotic as his people do not raise livestock. His intention is to become a dragon. Like the dwarf and high elf he is also a Silver ranked adventurer.

A sorceress who is an acquaintance of Goblin Slayer. She is Spearman's partner. She speaks very slowly, pausing between each word. She has enough magical power to not care about wasting it and even uses costly magic (due to it having a usage quota) just to light her pipe.

A warrior who usually belittles Goblin Slayer for his habit of hunting only goblins despite being a Silver Rank adventurer. He is Witch's partner. He has a crush on Guild girl and as such, is annoyed at how Goblin Slayer constantly steals her attention, even if unintentionally. Spearman has the reputation of being the strongest adventurer of the borderlands.

One of the heroes who helped defeat the previous Demon Lord, and now the highest authority in Water Town, the 25-year-old Sword Maiden had no innate talents like the other heroes, so she developed and honed her abilities from scratch instead. She was blinded and raped by goblins after being captured by them once, and since then she has a deep fear of them, thus hiring Goblin Slayer and his friends to deal with goblins lurking under the city. She commands an alligator familiar which protects the city sewers from goblin attacks. She is a gold ranked adventurer and the archbishop of Supreme God.

A swordswoman of noble origin, she left her home to become an adventurer until her party is slain by goblins and she is captured by them. She is rescued by Goblin Slayer's party by request of her parents and assists them to dispose of the goblins to avenge her fallen comrades.

Production
Goblin Slayer was posted on an online textboard starting from October 2012, as a work that combined ASCII art with dialogue (The format is known as "Yaruo Thread" on Japanese internet). The series was then rewritten into the format of a novel and submitted to competitions organized by publishers. As such, the novel version was completed before the online version. The novel was subsequently amended to match the ending of the online version, which was created according to real time feedback from users on the internet. Although the novel version failed to win awards in the Fujimi Fantasia Contest, it was picked up by GA Bunko editors when the author enrolled his other works into their competition. As such the work started publishing commercially via GA Bunko.

The author and the publisher both consider the ASCII art version to be distinct from the novel. They do not consider the published novel to be based on the online version. Instead the published novel is said to be based on the version that was submitted to Fujimi Fantasia Contest.

Media

Light novels

The light novels are written by Kumo Kagyu and illustrated by Noboru Kannatsuki. The series was originally published online. SB Creative published the first volume under their GA Bunko imprint on February 15, 2016. Sixteen volumes have been released in Japan as of July 2022.

The fourth volume of the light novel included an original audio drama CD written by Kagyu, as did the sixth, seventh, and eighth volumes.

A spin-off novel written by Kagyu and illustrated by Shingo Adachi, titled , published the first volume on March 15, 2018. It is a prequel series that reveals Goblin Slayer's past and the events that led him to become an adventurer with the sole purpose of exterminating all goblins from the world.

Kagyu released a second spinoff, titled , in the Gangan GA online magazine. The series ran for nine chapter and was collected into three volumes.

Yen Press licensed the novels for publication in North America, and released the first volume in English on December 20, 2016. Yen Press has also licensed the Year One and Dai Katana spinoffs.

Manga

A manga adaptation by Kōsuke Kurose began serialization in the June 2016 issue of Square Enix's seinen manga magazine Monthly Big Gangan on May 25, 2016. Yen Press licensed the series at the same time as the light novels, and are simulpublishing the chapters in English as they are released in Japan. 
Artist Kento Eida launched a prequel manga, titled Goblin Slayer Side Story: Year One, in Square Enix's seinen magazine Young Gangan on September 15, 2017. As with the main manga, the prequel is simulpublished by Yen Press.

A second adaptation of the main story, this one titled Goblin Slayer: Brand New Day and illustrated by Masahiro Ikeno, was serialized in Square Enix's Monthly Big Gangan from May 25, 2018 to May 27, 2019, and was compiled into two volumes. The story adapts the fourth volume of the light novel. Yen Press also simulpublished Brand New Day. The story follows the lives of the many other characters the main series' protagonists have encountered throughout their adventures, providing background on minor characters which further explores the world that Goblin Slayer takes place in.

Takashi Minakuchi launched a manga adaptation of the Goblin Slayer Side Story II: Dai Katana novel on Square Enix's Manga Up! app and on the Gangan GA website. Thre chapters were published from December 28, 2018 to April 12, 2019. The manga was canceled and rebooted under a new artist, Aoki Shogo, with the first chapter published on August 30, 2019.

A manga by Daichi Matsuse titled Goblin Slayer: Day in the Life, adapting the twefth volume of the light novel, began serialization in Monthly Big Gangan on December 23, 2022.

Anime

A 12-episode anime television series adaptation by White Fox premiered from October 7 to December 30, 2018, and was broadcast on AT-X, Tokyo MX, Sun TV, and BS11. The series is directed by Takaharu Ozaki, with scripts penned by Hideyuki Kurata and Yōsuke Kuroda, character designs handled by Takashi Nagayoshi and music composed by Kenichiro Suehiro. Funimation produced an English dub for the series, while Crunchyroll simulcasted the series internationally. Muse Communication licensed the series in Southeast Asia and South Asia.

The premiere of the first episode caused some controversy for its content due to the series being mis-rated as TV-PG by Crunchyroll when it first aired. Crunchyroll has since given the series a rating of TV-MA and added a content warning.

At the "GA Fes 2021" event livestream, it was announced that anime series will receive a second season. It is produced by Liden Films and directed by Misato Takada, with Ozaki serving as chief director, and Hiromi Kato designing the characters. Kurata and Suehiro are returning as scriptwriter and composer, respectively. The second season is set to premiere in 2023.

Films

A film, titled Goblin Slayer: Goblin's Crown, with returning staff and cast, premiered on February 1, 2020.

</onlyinclude>

Reception
The light novel ranked fifth in 2017 in Takarajimasha's annual light novel guide book Kono Light Novel ga Sugoi!, in the bunkobon category.

The first volume of the manga reached 39th place on the weekly Oricon manga rankings, selling 20,360 copies in its first week.

Controversy
Goblin Slayer was one of two works cited by Matt Shaheen as pornographic when justifying his efforts to lead a book ban in Texas schools. In July 2020, the manga became one of seven titles to be removed from Books Kinokuniya in Australia for claims of promoting child pornography.

Notes

References

External links
  at GA Bunko 
  at Monthly Big Gangan 
  
 

2016 Japanese novels
2018 Japanese novels
Anime and manga about revenge
Anime and manga based on light novels
Anime and manga controversies
Dark fantasy anime and manga
Dwarves in popular culture
Fiction about monsters
Fictional goblins
Funimation
GA Bunko
Gangan Comics manga
Fiction about government
Hideyuki Kurata
Liden Films
Light novels first published online
Light novels
Monarchy in fiction
Muse Communication
Rape in fiction
Rating controversies in television
Obscenity controversies in comics
Obscenity controversies in literature
Seinen manga
Sony Pictures Entertainment Japan franchises
Square Enix franchises
Television shows written by Yōsuke Kuroda
Upcoming anime television series
Villains in animated television series
White Fox
Witchcraft in anime and manga
Yen Press titles